The Central Registry of War Criminals and Security Suspects, more commonly known as CROWCASS, was an organisation set up to assist the United Nations War Crimes Commission and Allied governments in tracing ex-enemy nationals suspected of committing war crimes or atrocities in Europe during the Second World War. The organisation was originally set up by the Supreme Headquarters Allied Expeditionary Force (SHAEF) in 1945.

In 1947, CROWCASS published a four volume list divided into Germans, Non Germans and two supplementary lists of people suspected of committing war crimes between September 1939 and May 1945. To Allied Nazi hunters the CROWCASS lists became known as the 'Nazi Hunter's Bible'. The lists contain over 60,000 people in all. Not all of them are war criminals (some were simply being sought for interrogation or to act as witnesses), however within the pages of CROWCASS are the alleged perpetrators of tens of thousands of war crimes. Among those on the list are Case Registry No 1: Adolf Hitler - wanted for murder by Poland, Czechoslovakia and Belgium.

In 2005, the British government sanctioned the publication of the CROWCASS Consolidated Wanted Lists. Originally the lists were not intended to be in the public domain until the year 2023.

See also 
 Central Registry of War Criminals and Security Suspects from the Kingdom of Italy

Footnotes

References
 Simpson, Christopher. Blowback: The first full account of America's recruitment of Nazis, and its disastrous effects on our domestic and foreign policy, Chapter 6 'CROWCASS' pp. 66–79,  1988, Collier Books, Macmillan Publishing Company. 398 pp. 
 The Central Registry of War Criminals and Security Suspects, Consolidated Wanted Lists (1947), 2005, The Naval and Military Press, Uckfield

International judicial organizations
Organizations established in 1945